Eagle Harbor is an incorporated town in the far southeast corner of Prince George's County, Maryland, United States, and near the rural community of Aquasco that is known as a historic African American community founded in 1925. Per the 2020 census, the population was 67. The Chalk Point Generating Station, owned by NRG Energy, which was sold to Mirant  by the Potomac Electric Power Company (PEPCO) in 2000, is located adjacent to the town.

Geography
Eagle Harbor is located at  (38.566709, -76.686841).

Climate
The climate in this area is characterized by hot, humid summers and generally mild to cool winters.  According to the Köppen Climate Classification system, Eagle Harbor has a humid subtropical climate, abbreviated "Cfa" on climate maps.

History
Eagle Harbor was originally known as Trueman Point, a river port established in the early 18th century to serve as a shipping point for tobacco plantations located in the Aquasco area.  In 1747, it was considered by the Maryland colony as an official tobacco inspection station, but it never realized that designation.  In 1817, George Weems established the Weems Steamboat Company, connecting Trueman Point to other landings along the Patuxent River. He also built a tobacco warehouse, and ships routinely stopped at Trueman Landing. The steamboat traffic continued into the 1930s. Trueman Point Landing is a local historic site identified by the Maryland-National Capital Park and Planning Commission.

Located just  from Washington, D.C., in 1925, developer Walter L. Bean purchased land adjoining Trueman Point with the vision of creating a resort community for middle-class African Americans from the area.  Lots were offered for $50.00 or less, and the community was advertised as "a high class summer colony for the better people."  After a number of summer cottages were constructed, the community incorporated as the town of Eagle Harbor in 1929.

Demographics

2020 census

2010 census
As of the census of 2010, there were 63 people, 22 households, and 16 families living in the town. The racial makeup of the town was 7.9% White and 92.1% African American.

There were 22 households, of which 27.3% had children under the age of 18 living with them, 50.0% were married couples living together, 22.7% had a female householder with no husband present, and 27.3% were non-families. 13.6% of all households were made up of individuals. The average household size was 2.86 and the average family size was 3.38.

The median age in the town was 47.8 years. 28.6% of residents were under the age of 18; 1.6% were between the ages of 18 and 24; 14.3% were from 25 to 44; 39.6% were from 45 to 64; and 15.9% were 65 years of age or older. The gender makeup of the town was 50.8% male and 49.2% female.

2000 census
As of the census of 2000, there were 55 people, 24 households, and 15 families living in the town. The racial makeup of the town was 30.91% White, 65.45% African American, 1.82% Native American, and 1.82% from two or more races.

There were 24 households, out of which 16.7% had children under the age of 18 living with them, 29.2% were married couples living together, 29.2% had a female householder with no husband present, and 37.5% were non-families. 37.5% of all households were made up of individuals, and 20.8% had someone living alone who was 65 years of age or older. The average household size was 2.29 and the average family size was 3.00.

In the town, the population was spread out, with 21.8% under the age of 18, 5.5% from 18 to 24, 20.0% from 25 to 44, 36.4% from 45 to 64, and 16.4% who were 65 years of age or older. The median age was 46 years. For every 100 females, there were 89.7 males. For every 100 females age 18 and over, there were 79.2 males.

The median income for a household in the town was $58,750, and the median income for a family was $65,625. Males had a median income of $80,138 versus $20,417 for females. The per capita income for the town was $16,255. There were 15.4% of families and 22.4% of the population living below the poverty line, including 56.3% of under eighteens and none of those over 64.

Government
Prince George's County Police Department District 5 Station in Clinton CDP serves the community.

Transportation

The only method of transportation to Eagle Point is by road. No state highways serve the town. The main road within Eagle Harbor is Trueman Point Road. Ending at Trueman Point along the Patuxent River, it extends southwest, becoming Eagle Harbor Road, and connects with Maryland Route 381.

Education
Residents who live in Eagle Harbor are zoned to Prince George's County Public Schools:
 Baden Elementary School
 Gwynn Park Middle School
 Gwynn Park High School

References

External links

 Maryland Manual Online site for Eagle Harbor

Towns in Prince George's County, Maryland
Towns in Maryland
African-American history of Prince George's County, Maryland
Populated places established in 1929
1929 establishments in Maryland